"Vaya con Dios (May God Be With You)" (literally "Go with God") is a popular song written by Larry Russell, Inez James, and Buddy Pepper, and first recorded by Anita O'Day in December 1952. Les Paul and Mary Ford had a  1 recording of the song in 1953. Members of the Western Writers of America chose it as one of the Top 100 Western songs of all time.

Background
The most-popular version of the song was recorded by Les Paul and Mary Ford. This recording was released by Capitol Records as catalog number 2486 with "Johnny (Is the Boy For Me)" as the flip side in May 1953. It first reached the Billboard magazine Best Seller chart on June 13, 1953 and lasted 31 weeks on the chart, reaching number one on August 8 and remaining at number one for a total of 11 non-consecutive weeks. The song also reached number one on the Cash Box chart where it remained at No. 1 for five weeks. The song was ranked the No. 1 top tune of 1953, and the second best selling song of the year.

The Les Paul and Mary Ford single reached No. 7 in the UK backed with the Les Paul instrumental composition "Deep in the Blues" as the flip side.

In 2005, the 1953 Les Paul and Mary Ford recording was inducted in the Grammy Hall of Fame.

Other notable recordings

The song has been recorded by:
  
 Roberto Alagna
 Peter Alexander (in German)
 Desi Arnaz, who sang it in two season 3 episodes of I Love Lucy; "Lucy and Ethel Buy the Same Dress" (1953) and "Home Movies" (1954)
 Chet Atkins
 Gene Autry
 Rico Barr & the Jump 'n' Jive Review, with Kate Davis, vocals (on the soundtrack for Disney's The Finest Hours) (2016)
 Jeff Beck with Imelda May (2011)
 Rob & Gilly Bennett (1993)
 Lily Berglund (in Swedish)
 The Beverley Sisters (1953)
 Chuck Berry (1965) On album Fresh Berrys
 Roy Black (in German)
 Pat Boone (1959) On duet album Pat & Shirley Boone Side By Side
 Rocky Burnette
 Carole Carr with orchestra cond. by Hill Bowen. Recorded in London on September 13, 1953. It was released by EMI on the His Master's Voice label as catalog number B 10570.
 The Cats (1968 on album The Cats and in 1972 on single)
 Richard Clayderman
 Larry Clinton (1953)
 Nat King Cole (in Spanish)
 Giorgio Consolini in Italian
 Bing Crosby - recorded December 31, 1953  and included on his album Bing Sings the Hits (1954)
 Julie Daraîche (in French)
 Manu Dibango
 The Drifters (1964)
 Dyango in his 1977 album Contigo en la Distancia
 Tommy Edwards (1961) 
 Chiemi Eri (in Japanese)
 Emile Ford and his band The Checkmates on his 1961 album "Emile".
 Freddy Fender (1976)
 The Fontane Sisters on their 1957 album "A Visit With The Fontane Sisters".
 Inez & Charlie Fox
 Connie Francis (Spanish: 1960, German: 1966)
 Don Gibson
 Jairo (1982)
 Harry James – Harry James & His Western Friends (Dot DLP 3735 and DLP 25735)
 Julio Iglesias – in 1976 Spanish version, in 2005 French version "C'est Votre Histoire Et La Mienne"
 Pedro Infante (1953 in Spanish)
 Joni James
 Gloria Jones
 Andrea Jürgens (1990)
 Kitty Kallen
 Ginette & Raymond Lavoie in French
 Byron Lee
 The Lennon Sisters
 Bob London (1953)
 Julie London - Latin in a Satin Mood
 Wingy Manone (1953)
 Al Martino (1978)
 The McGuire Sisters (1966)
 Miguel Aceves Mejía
 Millican & Nesbitt (1973)
 Bob Moore (1967)
 Nana Mouskouri
 Anne Murray (2002)
 Chico O'Farrill
 Tony Orlando & Dawn (1972)
 Los Panchos
 Les Paul & Mary Ford (1953)
 The Popes
 Jim Reeves
 Semprini with Rhythm Accompaniment. Recorded in London on October 13, 1953 as the first melody of the medley "Dancing to the piano (No. 22) – Hit medley of waltzes" along with "My Love, My Love" and "The Melba Waltz". The medley was released by EMI on the His Master's Voice label as catalog number B 10592.
 Hank Snow
 Sunshine Quartett
 Sylvia Syms (1968)
 Mel Tormé - ¡Olé Tormé!
 Doris Troy (1970) On Apple album Doris Troy. Song produced by Troy and Beatle George Harrison who also played guitar on it. 
 Jerry Vale
 Johnny Ventura
 Slim Whitman
 Roger Whittaker

References

Sources

Jacobson, Bob. Les Paul: Guitar Wizard. Madison, Wisconsin: Wisconsin Historical Society Press, 2012.
Shaughnessy, Mary. Les Paul: An American Original. New York: Morrow, 1993.
Wyckoff, Edwin Brit. Electric Guitar Man: The Genius of Les Paul. Genius at Work! Berkeley Heights, N.J.: Enslow Publishers, 2008.

1953 songs
Songs about parting
The Drifters songs
Nat King Cole songs
Freddy Fender songs
Number-one singles in the United States
Spanish-language songs
Les Paul songs
Mary Ford songs
Nana Mouskouri songs
Capitol Records singles